"Infinity plus" may refer to:

Infinity plus, a science-fiction webzine
 a 1996 album by Lois Maffeo
 a 1999 album by B! Machine
 a collection of games from the Infinity video game series
 the mathematical concept of infinity plus one